In enzymology, a glutathione—cystine transhydrogenase is an enzyme that catalyzes the chemical reaction
2 glutathione + cystine  glutathione disulfide + 2 cysteine

Thus, the two substrates of this enzyme are glutathione and cystine, whereas its two products are glutathione disulfide and cysteine.

This enzyme belongs to the family of oxidoreductases, specifically those acting on a sulfur group of donors with a disulfide as acceptor.  The systematic name of this enzyme class is glutathione:cystine oxidoreductase. Other names in common use include GSH-cystine transhydrogenase, and NADPH-dependent GSH-cystine transhydrogenase.  This enzyme participates in cysteine metabolism and glutathione metabolism.

References

 

EC 1.8.4
Enzymes of unknown structure